The Convention of Progress Forces was a political alliance in Burkina Faso (former Upper Volta. 
It was founded in January 1994 by the following political parties:

Group of Patriotic Democrats
Union of Social Democrats
Movement of Progressive Democrats
Union of Democrats and Patriots of Burkina
Alliance for Progress and Freedom
Patriotic Movement for Freedom and Development
Movement for Socialist Democracy
League for Progress and Development
Revolutionary Workers Party of Burkina

Defunct political party alliances in Burkina Faso